Sumiarto Suharto (born Troely Callebaut; June 8, 1928 – May 1, 1971), better known by the stage name Mimi Mariani, was an Indonesian actress, model, and singer who was of mixed Belgian, Dutch, and Manado. Known as the first Sri Asih, Mariani was the sister of actress Sri Murniati and film editor Emile Callebaut, and the aunt of actress Doris Callebaut. She was one of Indonesian's leading lady in the 1950s, and was ranked third on the list of the best pasindhèn in Indonesia film industry. She was the part of Classical Indonesian Cinema. 

Born in Malang, Mariani went to MULO but later dropped out from the school. She began her career as a stage actress and singer by joining Bintang Soerabaja troupe in 1942, and later joined Warnasari troupe. After the Indonesian National Revolution, Mariani made her film debut by taking a minor role in Inspektur Rachman (1950), and Rodrigo de Villa (1952). She made her feature film debut in Lenggang Djakarta (1953) where she drew critics' attention.

By 1953, Mariani was one of the most popular Indonesian stars. She had another leading roles in the folklore drama Machluk Raksasa, and in the sociological drama Belenggu Masjarakat. In 1954, she starred in five film roles such as Sri Asih, Debu Revolusi, Rahasia Sukudomas, Putri Gunung, and Djubah Hitam.

After Sri Asih became box office success, she married Turino Djunaedy, and remained with him until divorced in 1958 due to film industry crisis. Later, Mariani starred in Oh, Ibuku (1955), the first movie from Gadis Tiga Djaman series, created by Ali Joego. Her last film in 1955 were Ibu Dan Putri, a third and last movie from Gadis Tiga Djaman series.

Mariani married four times and had four children. In 1969, she was diagnosed with lymphoma which required her to underwent surgery twice. Mariani then went into bed rest but later slipped into coma, and later died on May 1, 1971, at the age of 42 from the disease.  She died at her home in Kebon Kelapa, and was buried in Karet Bivak Cemetery.

Early life 
Mimi Mariani was born Troely Callebaut on June 8, 1928, in Malang, Dutch East Indies to Petrus Fransiskus Callebaut and Fien Callebaut. She was of Belgian, Dutch, and Manado descent. Her brothers were Emile Callebaut (born June 15, 1930), and Frans Callebaut. While her sisters were Livine Callebaut, Clara Callebaut, Onie Callebaut, Betsy Callebaut, Lena Callebaut, Richielde de Mathilde Callebaut (October 13, 1923 – June 29, 2017), Meity Callebaut, and Greta Callebaut. Her sister, Richielde, better known under the name Sri Murniati, was an Indonesian actress active in the 1950s, whom was referred as the Kasma Booty of Indonesia. While her brother, Emile, a Indonesia-based film editor, who was the father of actress Doris Callebaut.

Mariani went to MULO, but later dropped out from the school.

Personal life

Marriages, relationship, and children 
Mariani married four times and divorced for three times, she had four children.

In 1954, she began a relationship with actor Turino Djunaedy. They often goes to party and dancing together. After starred in Sri Asih (1954), they married in 1955, and divorced in 1958 due to film industry crisis.

Mariani married to Titi Murni Pharmacy owner Yusman Effendi (born 1944), their marriage lasted until Mariani's death in 1971.

Illness and death 

In 1969, Mariani was diagnosed with lymphoma and underwent surgery twice. But due to the cancer already spreading to her spleen, the doctor forbid her from going through with the third operation.

Mariani then went into bed rest for five months at her residence in Kebon Kelapa, Jakarta. She slipped into a coma on April 24, 1971 and died one week later, a month before her 43th birthday, and was buried on May 2, 1971 at Karet Bivak Cemetery. Among the mourners were Fifi Young, Sofia W.D., W.D. Mochtar, and S. Poniman.

Career 

Mariani started her career by joined Bintang Soerabaja troupe as a singer in 1942. She also joined Warna Sari troupe as a singer and actress.

Later, she joined Pantja Warna troupe, and established Panggung Bhakti Artis along with Netty Herawaty.

After the Indonesian National Revolution, Mariani made her film debut by taking a minor role in Inspektur Rachman (1950), along with the newcomers actress, Nana Mayo. She also taking a minor role in Indonesian-Philippine historical drama, Rodrigo de Villa (1952), again with Mayo.

1953–1957: Rising star 

Mariani starred in four movies that were released in 1953, she made her film debut as the female lead in Lenggang Djakarta (1953) opposite Bambang Hermanto. In this film, she played Nani, a city girl who falls in love triangle with a married man.

Her second film of 1953, the urban fantasy drama Machluk Raksasa which was adapted from the Javanese folklore story, Timun Mas.

She co-starred with Amran S. Mouna and Wahid Chan in her third movie of the year, Belenggu Masjarakat, which won the Best Cinematography award at the Indonesian Film Festival in 1955. Her last film role in that year, a bit parts in Kassan.

In early 1954, Mariani began to filming Indonesian first superhero film, Sri Asih, which was adapted from comic by R. A. Kosasih with the same title. This film was directed by Tan Sing Hwat and produced by Turino Djunaedy, Mariani's second husband. In this film, she played Sri Asih, a woman who has superhero powers with the help from an amulet. No prints of Sri Asih are known to exist today, but a production still of Mariani in costume as Sri Asih have survived.

Mariani then starred in Indonesian historical drama, Debu Revolusi, co-starring Rendra Karno. She played Martini, a city girl who fall in love with a national soldier from Operation Kraai. She also starred in Rahasia Sukudomas, the first Indonesian film where all the actors are women.

In mid 1954, Mariani starred in Putri Gunung, again co-starred with Bambang Hermanto. In this film, she played the role of Hermanto's niece. She starred in Djubah Hitam for her last film role in that year, where she played the role as a girlfriend of Commander Imam.

In 1955, Mariani starred in Oh, Ibuku, the first movie from Gadis Tiga Djaman series made by Ali Joego. In this film, she played the stepmother Rosila, opposite Hasnah Tahar. Mariani then starred alongside Tahar again in Ibu dan Putri (1955), a third and the last movie in Gadis Tiga Djaman series.

In 1956, Mariani starred in Sri Kustina co-starring Sukarno M. Noor. In this film she played Sri Kustina, a club singer who is married to a gambler and drunkard, which was played by Noor. She then starred in Bachtiar Siagian's propaganda film Melati Sendja, which also co-starring him. In this film, she played Ningsih, a woman who falls in love triangle with a musician, Arman, who was played by Siagian.

In 1957, Mariani starred in Usmar Ismail's directed film Delapan Pendjuru Angin, one of three commercial films produced by Perfini. In this film, she played Sintawati, an actress and singer who was one of the Armansyah's lover played by Bambang Hermanto.

1958–1968: Career decline and later years 

After Indonesia film industry crisis and her divorce from Turino Djunaedy in 1958, Mariani had no longer working on the film.

On January 3, 1958, Mariani performed in Juliam Bros's directed play Because of Dance at the Jakarta Art Building in Sawah Besar, Central Jakarta, along with Wahid Chan. She played a middle school girl who fall in love with a dancer, played by Chan.

Mariani returned to film by starring in Nina (1960), taking a role as the Martini's mother. She then starred in Lima Puluh Megaton (1961), co-starring A. Hamid Arief. Mariani's role were quite supporting role after she returned to industry, as she was no longer considered suited for a leading role by the film industry. She later starred in national film, Si Kembar (1961), as a pasindhèn, along with Titim Fatimah. The film later became box office success,  and listed Mariani as one of the best Indonesian pasindhèn, after Fatimah and Sarimanah.

In 1966, Mariani starred in Cheque AA, again taking a supporting role. Her last film were B-29 (1968), released a year before she was diagnosed with lymphoma.

Filmography 

In her twenty-six-year career, Mariani appeared in twenty one films:

 Inspektur Rachman (1950)
 Rodrigo de Villa (1952)
 Machluk Raksasa (1953)
 Lenggang Djakarta (1953)
 Belenggu Masjarakat (1953)
 Kassan (1953)
 Sri Asih (1954)
 Rahasia Sukudomas (1954)
 Putri Gunung (1954)
 Djubah Hitam (1954)
 Debu Revolusi (1954)
 Oh, Ibuku (1955)
 Ibu dan Putri (1955)
 Sri Kustina (1956)
 Melati Sendja (1956)
 Delapan Pendjuru Angin (1957)
 Nina (1960)
 Si Kembar (1961)
 Limapuluh Megaton (1961)
 Cheque AA (1966)
 B-29 (1968)

Legacy 
In Sri Asih (2022), Mariani's stage name was used as the name of Eyang Mariani. Her role as the first Sri Asih was remade and portrayed by Najwa Shihab.

Notes

References

Works cited 

 Online sources

Bibliography

External links 

1928 births
1971 deaths
20th-century Indonesian actresses
20th-century Indonesian women singers
20th-century Dutch East Indies people
20th-century Dutch women
Actresses of the Dutch East Indies
Film child actresses
Indonesian child actresses
Indonesian female models
Glamour models
Deaths from cancer in Indonesia
Deaths from lymphoma